This is a list of NCAA Division I men's soccer players who have reached both 40 goals and 40 assists in their careers. Numbers in bold italics indicate the highest number for each category among the players in the list.

Since the arrival of Major League Soccer and its academy system there have been fewer division I college players playing all four years, thus reducing the number of players that have been in the 40-40 club for soccer. Only two players reached the achievement since MLS began play, and the last player to reach this achievement was Andy Williams, in 1997, who has since retired from the game.

Key

List

References 
General

 

Footnotes

External links 
 NCAA Division I Men's Soccer Record Book

NCAA Division I men's soccer statistical leaders